The Men's EAD 50 metre freestyle event at the 2002 Commonwealth Games was held on 1 August at the Manchester Aquatics Centre.

Classification
The events were run on a multi-disability format, which included both physically disabled and visually impaired swimmers i.e. the International Paralympic Committee’s Swimming Classification S1 – S13.

Classes S1 – S10 are allocated to swimmers with a physical disability ranging from swimmers with a severe disability (S1) to those with a minimal disability (S10).
Classes S11 – S13 are allocated to swimmers with a visual impairment ranging from swimmers with no vision or may have light perception (S11) to those with some visual acuity (S13).

Format
All classes, 1 through 13 swan together in 3 heats and a final event. Positions were determined by each athlete’s time relative to the current world record for the appropriate classification of the swimmer. This may have meant that the swimmer touching first may not have been the winner.

World records were time standardised to identify both the finalists and medal winners throughout the competition. This meant that the same ‘time marker’ was used in the heats and the final irrespective of whether the world record had been broken during the course of competition.

Records
Prior to this competition, the existing world records were as follows;

The following records were established during the competition:

Results

Heats
The 8 fastest swimmers in the heats qualified for the semifinals.

Final
The final was held on 1 August at 19:37.

References

Men's EAD 50 metre freestyle